Aseem Merchant is an Indian actor known for his roles in Bollywood films.

Filmography

Personal life
Aseem entered the Bollywood arena as a model. He is divorced and has a daughter Sasha Merchant. He is also rumored to have dated Priyanka Chopra during her modelling days

Controversies
Aseem has been in controversy for being involved in producing a biopic on Prakash Jaju, ex-manager of Priyanka Chopra.

See also
Sara Khan
Surjit Saha
Sayantani Ghosh
Tina Dutta

External links

References

Living people
Indian male film actors
Year of birth missing (living people)